The   New York Giants season was the franchise's 81st season in the National Football League (NFL). The Giants finished the regular season with 11 wins and 5 losses and came in first place of the NFC East. However, they would lose to the Carolina Panthers in the Wild Card round of the playoffs.

Offseason
In the 2005 offseason the Giants acquired former Steelers’ wide receiver Plaxico Burress, former Jets offensive tackle Kareem McKenzie and former Redskins linebacker Antonio Pierce as free agents. Also, during the 2005 Draft, the Giants used their first pick on Louisiana State cornerback Corey Webster. They then used their next pick on Notre Dame defensive end Justin Tuck.  The rest of their picks included Southern Illinois running back Brandon Jacobs and Florida State defensive end Eric Moore.

Draft

Undrafted free agents

Roster

Regular season
The Giants won their first two games of the season, against the Arizona Cardinals (42–19) and a second game at the Meadowlands against the New Orleans Saints. The game was originally slated to be a home game for the Saints but had to be moved since the city of New Orleans was still recovering from Hurricane Katrina, and the Louisiana Superdome was untenable after being used as an emergency shelter for locals displaced by the hurricane. Despite the Saints wearing their home colors and the Saints colors and logo being painted in one of the end zones, the game was a de facto home game for the Giants who won easily, 27–10. The Giants lost to the Chargers the following week, 45–23, in a game which was marked by Chargers fans booing and jeering Eli Manning for refusing to play for the Chargers. Manning and the Giants rebounded the following week however, and beat the St. Louis Rams by a score of 44–24.

Through eight games, Burress, in a bid to become the first Giant wideout to make the Pro Bowl in 37 years, had 45 catches and five scores. Jeremy Shockey, who had not been as effective as he was in his rookie season, also was beginning to re-emerge with 32 catches and over 500 yards receiving after eight weeks.

On October 25, 2005, beloved Giants patriarch Wellington Mara died after a brief illness, at the age of 89. Mara had been involved with the Giants since he was 9 years old, when he was a ball boy for the Giants. Except a tour of duty in the military during World War II, Mara spent his entire adult life with the Giants. The New York Giants dedicated their next game to Mara, and shut out the Washington Redskins 36–0. Afterwards, the Giants went on the road and defeated the San Francisco 49ers 24–6, but when they got home, lost to the Minnesota Vikings 24–21. Just twenty days after Mara's death, on November 15, 2005, the other Giants Executive Officer and well-known businessman Bob Tisch died at the age of 79. He was diagnosed in 2004 with inoperable brain cancer. Tisch was a philanthropist all his life and donated considerable sums of money to charitable causes. After his diagnosis, he donated money to institutions aimed towards the research of drugs and treatments to control brain tumors.

The Giants then travelled to Seattle to play the Seahawks. With the score tied at 21, kicker Jay Feely missed three field goals that would have given the Giants the lead. The Giants lost 24–21 when Seahawks kicker Josh Brown kicked a 36-yard field goal. The Giants then defeated the Cowboys 17–10. the Giants defense made opposing QB Drew Bledsoe go 15 of 39 for 146 yards with only one touchdown pass and two interceptions. The Giants then traveled to Philadelphia, Pennsylvania and defeated the defending NFC champion Eagles 26–23.

During the season, the Giants and their stadium mates, the New York Jets, announced plans for a new stadium to replace Giants Stadium for both teams. Construction of said stadium began in 2007 and continued for two years, and the venue opened in 2010 as New Meadowlands Stadium. In 2011 naming rights would be bought by MetLife.

On December 17, 2005, in their 27–17 home victory against the Kansas City Chiefs, Tiki Barber set the team's single game rushing yard record with 220 yards, breaking the previous record of 218 yards, which had been set by Gene Roberts on November 12, 1950.

The Giants were able to clinch at least a wild card berth without playing when the Minnesota Vikings fell to the Baltimore Ravens 30–23 in week 16. The Giants then won the NFC East title for the first time since 2000 with a 30–21 win against the Oakland Raiders. The team's appearance in the 2005 postseason was their 27th, tied with the Cowboys and the Rams for the most ever by an NFL team.

Schedule

Playoffs

While the Giants exceeded expectations in 2005, it came at the cost of key players suffering injuries over the course of the long season. An undermanned, and then depleted Giants squad lost 23–0 to the Carolina Panthers in the wild card round.

Game summary

Week 14

Standings

References

External links
espn.com 2005 New York Giants results page

New York Giants seasons
New York Giants
NFC East championship seasons
New York Giants season
21st century in East Rutherford, New Jersey
Meadowlands Sports Complex